Tales from the Vinegar Side is the 1990 second album by Gigolo Aunts, released on Imposible Records in Spain.  The record contains a cover of the Chris Bell composition "I Am the Cosmos" and the song "Down on Me", a modest Boston radio hit.  This release was the first of several for the band in Spain, where they are very popular, including a split single with the Posies of "I Am the Cosmos" in 1992 on Munster Records.

Track listing
Spanish Version (Imposible Records) Catalog Number: IMP-020 (1990), Format: LP

"I Am the Cosmos"  (Chris Bell)  3:09
"Down on Me"  (Gigolo Aunts)  3:40
"It Takes a Little Bit of Time"  (Gigolo Aunts)  3:46
"Bako Jr."  (Gigolo Aunts)  4:41
"Nervousness"  (Gigolo Aunts)  3:12
"The Vinegar Side"  (Gigolo Aunts)  3:12
"Come Down #4"  (Gigolo Aunts)  3:22
"That Just Goes to Show Ya"  (Gigolo Aunts)  4:14
"Pretty"  (Gigolo Aunts)  2:42
"Perspire"  (Gigolo Aunts)  2:29
"Home of the Brave"  (Gigolo Aunts)  4:28

References

1990 albums
Gigolo Aunts albums